The National Senior Games (Senior Olympics) are a sports competition for senior citizens in the United States. It is conducted by the National Senior Games Association (NSGA) once every two years. Akin to the Summer Olympics, it is a multi-sport event devoted to adults above the age of 50. It consists of regional competitions held yearly in all states of the US.

History 
The games were founded by Warren Blaney.  In 1969, the Los Angeles Memorial Coliseum Commission approved the 1970 meet. In June 1970 the first Senior Olympics took place at the Los Angeles Coliseum (1970 known as Senior Sports International Meet).  The games continued in the 1970s and 1980s in the Los Angeles and Orange County, California.  Today the meet is known as the Senior Games (or Senior Olympics). The Senior Games are now held in every state in the USA. In 1985 National Senior Olympics Organization (NSOO) was formed, and in 1990 NSGA took over control of the Senior Games.

A 1987 version attracted 2,500 people. Recent attendance (Louisville, 2007) had over 10,000 competitors and 20,000 spectators, with oldest competitors being over 100 years old.

In 2021 there are currently five regions under NSGA: Great Lakes, Northeast, Pacific, Southeast, and West. These national games are supported by the National Senior Games Association.

The Huntsman World Senior Games is an international senior sports competition begun in 1987. The 27 athletic events held in Southern Utah begin with the torch lighting in traditional Olympic fashion during the Opening Ceremonies.

Summary

Summer

The Senior Summer Olympics are conducted from 1970 the present day.

Winter
The Senior Winter Olympics were held from 2000 to 2011.

State Games 
NSGA State Regions:

 Northeast (12): Connecticut, Delaware, Maine, Maryland, Massachusetts, New Hampshire, New Jersey, New York, Pennsylvania, Rhode Island, Vermont, Washington, D.C.
 Southeast (12): Alabama, Arkansas, Florida, Georgia, Louisiana, Mississippi, Kentucky, North Carolina, South Carolina, Tennessee, Virginia, West Virginia
 Great Lakes (8): Illinois, Indiana, Iowa, Michigan, Minnesota, Missouri, Ohio, Wisconsin
 West (9): Colorado, Kansas, Nebraska, New Mexico, North Dakota, Oklahoma, South Dakota, Texas, Wyoming
 Pacific (10): Alaska, Arizona, California, Hawaii, Idaho, Montana, Nevada, Oregon, Utah, Washington

Sports
Individual Sports Competitions in the Senior Games:

 Archery
 Badminton
 Bowling
 Cornhole
 Cycling
 Golf
 Pickleball
 Powerwalk
 Race Walk
 Racquetball
 Road Race
 Shuffleboard
 Swimming
 Table Tennis
 Tennis
 Track & Field
 Triathlon
Team Sports Competitions:

 Basketball
 Beach Volleyball
 Soccer
 Softball
 Volleyball

Non-Ambulatory Sports Competitions:

 Non-Ambulatory Bowling
 Non-Ambulatory Cornhole
 Ambulatory Shuffleboard

See also
 Huntsman World Senior Games
 Senior sport
 Masters athletics (track and field)

References

 FAQ Frequently Asked Questions

External links

 Bay Area Senior Games
 Wyoming Winter Senior Olympics
 Wyoming Summer Senior Olympics
 National Senior Games Association
 NSGA Results and Records
 NSGA Dates and locations of previous Senior Games
 World Senior Games
 Julia "Hurricane" Hawkins age 103 wins several gold medals
 Deborah Wheeler, Local octogenarian wins in Olympics, The Walton Sun, July 5, 2007
 Dan Farrand, Golden memories: Local athletes win medals at Senior Olympics, NewsTimesLive, Jul 06 2007
 Associated Press, Gray grit: boom times for Senior Games, July 4, 2007
 Masters Events
 PBS Documentary, Age of Champions
 State by State Senior Games links
 Wisconsin Senior Olympics
 World Masters Games

 
Senior sports competitions
Multi-sport events in the United States
United States Seniors
Sports competitions in Canada
Recurring sporting events established in 1987
1970 establishments in the United States
1987 establishments in the United States